Phan Thị Kim Phúc  (born April 6, 1963), referred to informally as the girl in the picture and the  Napalm girl, is a South Vietnamese-born Canadian woman best known as the nine-year-old child depicted in the Pulitzer Prize–winning photograph, titled "The Terror of War", taken at Trảng Bàng during the Vietnam War on June 8, 1972.

The image, taken for the Associated Press by a 21-year-old Vietnamese-American photographer named Nick Ut, shows her at nine years of age running naked on a road after being severely burned on her back by a South Vietnamese napalm attack.

She later founded the Kim Foundation International to provide aid to child victims of war.

Vietnam War napalm attack
Phan Thi Kim Phúc and her family were residents of the village of Trảng Bàng in South Vietnam. On June 8, 1972, South Vietnamese planes dropped napalm on Trảng Bàng, which had been attacked and occupied by North Vietnamese forces. Kim Phúc joined a group of civilians and South Vietnamese soldiers who were fleeing from the Caodai Temple to the safety of South Vietnamese-held positions. The Republic of Vietnam Air Force pilot flying an A-1E Skyraider mistook the group for enemy soldiers and diverted to attack. The bombing killed two of Kim Phúc's cousins and two other villagers. Kim Phúc received third degree burns after her clothing was burned by the fire.

Images and rescue
Associated Press photographer Nick Ut took a photograph of Kim Phúc running naked amid other fleeing villagers, South Vietnamese soldiers, and other press photographers. This became one of the most haunting images of the Vietnam War. In an interview many years later, she recalled she was yelling, Nóng quá, nóng quá ("too hot, too hot") in the picture. The New York Times editors were at first hesitant to consider the photo for publication because of the nudity, but they eventually approved it. A cropped version of the photo—with the press photographers to the right removed—was featured on the front page of The New York Times the next day. It later earned a Pulitzer Prize and was chosen as the World Press Photo of the Year for 1973.

After snapping the photograph, Ut took Kim Phúc and the other injured children to Barsky Hospital in Saigon, where it was determined that her burns were so severe that she probably would not survive. After a 14-month hospital stay and 17 surgical procedures, including skin transplantations, she was able to return home. A number of the early operations were performed by Finnish plastic surgeon Aarne Rintala. It was only after treatment at a special hospital in Ludwigshafen, West Germany, in 1982, that Kim Phúc was able to properly move again.

Ut continued to visit Kim Phúc until he was evacuated during the fall of Saigon, and they now speak almost weekly via telephone.

Less publicized is the film, shot by British television cameraman Alan Downes for the British Independent Television News (ITN) and his Vietnamese counterpart Le Phuc Dinh who was working for the American television network NBC, which shows the events just before and after the photograph was taken (see image on right). In the top-left frame, a man stands and appears to take photographs as a passing airplane drops bombs. A group of children, Kim Phúc among them, run away in fear. After a few seconds, she encounters the reporters dressed in military fatigues, including Christopher Wain who gave her water (top-right frame) and poured some over her burns. As she turns sideways, the severity of the burns on her arm and back can be seen (bottom-left frame). A crying woman, Kim Phúc's grandmother, Tao, runs in the opposite direction holding her badly burned grandchild, 3-year-old Danh, Kim Phúc's cousin, who died of his injuries (bottom-right frame). Sections of the film shot were included in Hearts and Minds (1974), the Academy Award-winning documentary about the Vietnam War directed by Peter Davis.

Controversy
Audio tapes of President Richard Nixon, in conversation with his chief of staff, H. R. Haldeman in 1972, reveal that Nixon mused, "I'm wondering if that was fixed", after seeing the photograph. After the release of this tape, Ut commented, "Even though it has become one of the most memorable images of the twentieth century, President Nixon once doubted the authenticity of my photograph when he saw it in the papers on 12 June 1972... The picture for me and unquestionably for many others could not have been more real. The photo was as authentic as the Vietnam War itself. The horror of the Vietnam War recorded by me did not have to be fixed. That terrified little girl is still alive today and has become an eloquent testimony to the authenticity of that photo. That moment thirty years ago will be one Kim Phúc and I will never forget. It has ultimately changed both our lives."

Adult life
Phúc was removed from her university as a young adult studying medicine and used as a propaganda symbol by the communist government of Vietnam. Due to constant pain, she considered suicide, but in 1982 she found a New Testament in a library that led her to become a Christian. Her faith enabled her to forgive. In 1986, she was granted permission to continue her studies in Cuba. Prime Minister of Vietnam Phạm Văn Đồng became her friend and patron. After arriving in Cuba, she met Bui Huy Toan, another Vietnamese student and her future fiancé. In 1992, Phúc and Toan married.

On the way to their honeymoon in Moscow, they left the plane during a refuelling stop in Gander, Newfoundland, and asked for political asylum in Canada, which was granted. The couple now live in Ajax, Ontario and have two children. In 1996, Phúc met the surgeons who had saved her life. The following year, she became a Canadian citizen. In 2015, it was reported that she was receiving laser treatment, provided free of charge at a hospital in Miami, to reduce the scarring on her left arm and back.

Activism

In 1997, she established the first Kim Phúc Foundation in the U.S., with the aim of providing medical and psychological assistance to child victims of war. Later, other foundations were set up, with the same name, under an umbrella organization, Kim Phúc Foundation International.

In 2004, Phúc spoke at the University of Connecticut about her life and experience, learning how to be "strong in the face of pain" and how compassion and love helped her heal. She is a UNESCO Goodwill Ambassador and gives lectures around the world.

On December 28, 2009, National Public Radio broadcast her spoken essay, "The Long Road to Forgiveness," for the "This I Believe" series. In May 2010, Phúc was reunited by the BBC with ITN correspondent Christopher Wain, who helped to save her life. On May 18, 2010, Phúc appeared on the BBC Radio 4 programme Its My Story. In the programme, Phúc related how she was involved through her foundation in the efforts to secure medical treatment in Canada for Ali Abbas, who had lost both arms in a rocket attack on Baghdad during the invasion of Iraq in 2003.

In a December 21, 2017, article for The Wall Street Journal, Kim Phúc wrote that the trauma she suffered in the napalm strike still requires treatment, but that the psychological trauma was greater: "But even worse than the physical pain was the emotional and spiritual pain." This led directly to her conversion to Christianity, which she credits with healing the psychological trauma of living over forty years being known to the world as "Napalm Girl". "My faith in Jesus Christ is what has enabled me to forgive those who had wronged me," she wrote, "no matter how severe those wrongs were."

In July 2022, Kim Phúc in person welcomed 236 Ukrainian refugees with children aboard a special flight from Warsaw to Regina, Saskatchewan, Canada. The airplane used for the special flight bore an image of her iconic 1972 photo. The flight was arranged by an organization called Solidaire.

Recognition
In 1996, Kim Phúc gave a speech at the United States Vietnam Veterans Memorial on Veterans Day. In her speech, she said that one cannot change the past, but everyone can work together for a peaceful future. John Plummer, a Vietnam veteran, who said he took part in coordinating the air strike with the Republic of Vietnam Air Force (though Plummer's entire chain of command and declassified documents indicate otherwise) met with Phúc briefly and was publicly forgiven. Plummer later admitted to The Baltimore Sun he had lied, saying he was "caught up in the emotion at the Vietnam Veterans Memorial on the day Phuc spoke". Canadian filmmaker, Shelley Saywell, made a documentary about their meeting.

On November 10, 1994, Kim Phúc was named a UNESCO Goodwill Ambassador. Her biography, The Girl in the Picture, was written by Denise Chong and published in 1999. In 2003, Belgian composer Eric Geurts wrote "The Girl in the Picture," dedicated to Kim Phúc. It was released on Flying Snowman Records, with all profits going to the Kim Phúc Foundation. It was released again in 2021 as part of Eric's album "Leave a Mark".

Awards
On October 22, 2004, Kim Phúc was made a member of the Order of Ontario, and received an honorary Doctorate of Law from York University for her work to support child victims of war around the world. On October 27, 2005, she was awarded an honorary degree in Law from Queen's University in Kingston, Ontario.  On June 2, 2011, she was awarded the honorary degree of Doctor of Laws from the University of Lethbridge. On May 19, 2016, she was awarded a Doctor of Civil Law, Honoris Causa by Saint Mary's University (Halifax).

On February 11, 2019, Kim Phúc was awarded the 2019 Dresden Peace Prize in recognition of her work with UNESCO and as an activist for peace.

Retrospective works
The Girl in the Picture: The Kim Phúc Story, the Photograph and the Vietnam War by Denise Chong, is a 1999 biographical and historical book tracing the life story of Kim Phúc. Chong's historical coverage emphasizes the life, especially the school and family life, of Kim Phúc from before the attack, through convalescence, and into the present time. The book deals primarily with Vietnamese and American relationships during the Vietnam War, while examining themes of war, racism, immigration, political turmoil, repression, poverty, and international relationships through the lens of family and particularly through the eyes and everyday lives of women. Kim Phúc and her mother, Nu, provide the lens through which readers of The Girl in the Picture experience war, strife, and the development of communism in Vietnam. Like Chong's first book, The Girl in the Picture was shortlisted for the Governor General's Literary Award for non fiction.

See also
 Execution of Nguyễn Văn Lém – Another iconic image from the Vietnam War
 Thich Quang Duc – Vietnamese monk whose self-immolation was photographed
 Censorship by Facebook § Image censorship – Facebook censored the picture of the running Kim Phúc

References

Further reading
 .

External links

 Kim Phuc Foundation
 UNESCO: Kim Phúc Phan Thi
 
 
 
  (including 2003 photo)
 Archival Video: Napalm Girl Phan Thị Kim Phúc
 
 Joe McNally (2010). "Phan Thị Kim Phúc, 1995 (photograph)". joemcnally.com.

1963 births
1972 in Vietnam
Children in war
Converts to Christianity
Living people
Members of the Order of Ontario
People from Ajax, Ontario
People from Tây Ninh province
University of Havana alumni
Vietnam War casualties
Vietnamese evangelicals
Vietnamese defectors
Vietnamese emigrants to Canada
Vietnamese people of the Vietnam War
Canadian evangelicals
Naturalized citizens of Canada
Vietnam War photographs
People notable for being the subject of a specific photograph
1972 in art
UNESCO Goodwill Ambassadors
Burn survivors